Christopher Gaël Missilou (born 18 July 1992) is a professional footballer who plays as a midfielder.

He is a former France youth international and full Congo international. Missilou came through the youth ranks at Auxerre, before playing a single game in Ligue 1. He has had spells at Stade Brestois, Montceau Bourgogne, L'Etente SSG, Le Puy Foot, Oldham Athletic, Northampton Town, Swindon Town and Newport County. He most recently played for Hartlepool United.

Career

Oldham Athletic
On 13 July 2018, following a successful trial, Missilou signed a one-year contract with League Two side Oldham Athletic. In his first season he was a first team regular and was impressive in the team's standout 2–1 win at Premier league Fulham, in the FA Cup. Missilou scored a single league goal, in Paul Scholes' first match in charge of Oldham, a 4–1 victory against Yeovil Town

At the end of the 2018–19 season, a contract extension option was exercised.

Northampton Town
On 27 July 2020, Missilou joined League One club Northampton Town on a one-year deal.

Swindon Town
On 1 February 2021, Missilou joined League One side Swindon Town on a permanent basis. On 14 May 2021, it was announced that he would leave Swindon at the end of the season, following the expiry of his contract.

Newport County
On 2 July 2021, Missilou joined League Two club Newport County on a one-year deal. He made his debut for Newport on 10 August 2021 in the starting line-up for the 1–0 EFL Cup first round win against Ipswich Town. On 13 December 2021, his Newport contract was cancelled by mutual consent.

Return to Oldham Athletic
Missilou rejoined Oldham on 15 January 2022 for the remainder of the 2021–22 season. Missilou was released following relegation at the end of the season.

Hartlepool United
On 18 November 2022, Missilou joined League Two side Hartlepool United on a short term deal, re-joining former boss Keith Curle. Missilou scored on his Hartlepool debut, a late consolation in a defeat to Barrow. On 20 January 2023, manager Keith Curle confirmed that Missilou's short term deal had ended.

Career statistics

References

External links
 
 
 France profile at FFF
 
  

1992 births
Living people
Association football midfielders
Republic of the Congo footballers
Republic of the Congo international footballers
French footballers
French sportspeople of Republic of the Congo descent
Republic of the Congo expatriate footballers
Expatriate footballers in England
AJ Auxerre players
Évry FC players
Stade Brestois 29 players
FC Montceau Bourgogne players
Entente SSG players
Le Puy Foot 43 Auvergne players
Oldham Athletic A.F.C. players
Northampton Town F.C. players
Swindon Town F.C. players
Newport County A.F.C. players
Hartlepool United F.C. players
Ligue 1 players
Ligue 2 players
English Football League players
Championnat National players
Championnat National 2 players
Championnat National 3 players
Black French sportspeople